The Lalit Kala Akademi Fellowship, also known as Lalit Kala Akademi Ratna (Sanskrit ratna, "gem") is an honor for the fine arts in India. It is awarded to eminent artists for their lifetime achievements in the field of visual arts by the Lalit Kala Akademi, India's National Academy of Art. It is regarded as the highest recognition and honour that can be bestowed on an artist in the country as the academy is a national body of the Government of India.

The ‘Fellow,’ carries a purse-money of Rs.25,000/-, a citation and a plaque. The Fellow is honored with a portfolio about their major art works. The first elected fellow was Jamini Roy in 1955. Most recent fellowship was awarded for the year 2021 to Himmat Shah, Jyoti Bhatt and Shyam Sharma on 9 April 2022.

List of Fellows

See also
 List of Sangeet Natak Akademi fellows
 List of Sahitya Akademi fellows

References

External links
 of the Lalit Kala Akademi

 
Lists of Indian award winners
Indian art awards
Fellows of learned societies of India
Arts-related lists
Indian culture-related lists
Lists of members of learned societies